There was once a small but important community of Armenians in Afghanistan, centered in Kabul.
They lived peacefully among the Muslims, celebrated Nawroz together with them, and were even given the privilege to brew and drink wine.

History
In 1755, Jesuit missionary Joseph Tiefenthaler reported that Sultan Ahmad Shah Bahadur took several Armenian gunners from Lahore to Kabul.

The Perso-Indian diocese at Julfa sent Armenian priests to the community; however, after the priest died in the 1830 no replacement was sent and services were conducted by the deacon.

A number of early British explorers and travellers stayed with the Kabul Armenians including George Forster (1793), Edward Stirlng (1828) and Charles Masson (1832). When the missionary Joseph Wolff arrived in Kabul shortly after Masson, he preached in the Armenian church and by his account the community numbered about 23 people.  In 1793 George Foster said there were around 100 Armenians in Kabul and there were also a few living in Kandahar and Herat. Alexander Burnes reported there were 21 Armenians in Kabul while General Josiah Harlan claims there were 15. Early travellers noted that the Armenians made wine, some were members of the Amir's personal body guard, the ghulam khana, others were traders and some owned land between the Bala Hisar and But Khak.

James Lewis visited Afghanistan in the 19th century and documented his interactions with the Armenians of Afghanistan during his time in Kabul:

In 1839 during the First Anglo-Afghan War (1839-1842) the Rev. G. Piggott, army chaplain of Bombay Army Division, visited the Armenian church in Kabul and baptised two Armenian children.  In 1843 the Rev. I.N. Allen, who accompanied Gen. Pollock's Army of Retribution, also visited the Armenian church and recorded that:

After some inquiry, we discovered them in a street in the Bala Hissar, leading from the Jalalabad Gate; their buildings were on the north side of the street. We went up an alley, and turned into a small court on the left, surrounded by buildings, and filled with the implements of their trade. A little door led from this court into their church, a small dark building, but on procuring lights, I found that it was carpeted, and kept clean, apparently with great care. Its aspect was due east to west, and an altar stood on the east, surmounted by a small picture of a Holy Family, much dimmed by smoke and dust. Upon the altar were six candlesticks, two small crosses, and two copies of the Holy Gospels. In front, without the altar rails, was a small desk, on which lay a book of Daily Prayer, in Armenian. The altar was not against the wall, but had a space behind and stood on a raises step. Our guides showed me a volume containing the gospels in Armenian, and another with the epistles, also a small English pocket Bible with clasps,  edition, which I think was said to have been bought from an Hindoostanee. They state that their body came into Afghanistan with Nadir Shah; that they were then two hundred families, but were now reduced to four, comprising 35 persons, men, women and children".

During the British occupation, two leading members of Kabul's Armenian community supplied the British army with fodder, a fact which did not go unnoticed and after the British withdrawal the community suffered increased persecution and many were allowed to leave for Persia or India. However, at least three families remained behind. In 1848 Maj. G. Lawrence in Peshawar received a newsletter from his agent in Kabul reporting that Amir Dost Muhammad Khan's fourth son, Sardar Muhammad Azim Khan, planned to marry one of the daughters Timur, a leader of the Armenian community. Timur apparently appealed for Lawrence to use his influence with the Amir to prevent the marriage, but while Lawrence wrote to the Amir he satisfied himself that the marriage was not forced and the wedding went ahead. However, Timur's daughter was not forced to convert to Islam and continued to practice her Christian faith. Later she gave birth to a son, Muhammad Ishaq Khan who in 1888, as governor of Afghan Turkistan, rebelled against his cousin, Amir 'Abd al-Rahman Khan, only for the revolt to be crushed. Ishaq Khan fled to Russian-controlled Samarkand but his mother. Lucas and his brother, were imprisoned in Ghazni for several years.

British missionaries were interested in using the Armenian community as a base from which to conduct missionary work in Kabul; however, the community themselves reported that they had only converted one Afghan to Christianity, a robber who fell three times while attempting to break into their church to steal the valuable silver vessels stored therein, and then upon being discovered, begged for mercy and baptism.

As late as 1870, British reports showed 18 Armenian Christians remaining in Kabul. One Armenian man named Lucas A[rathun]Joseph, also known by the name Serwurdin (i.e. Sarwar al-din) Khan, managed the gunpowder factory at Jalalabad.

The Armenian church at Bala Hisar was levelled by order of General Roberts in the spring of 1880 during the Second Anglo-Afghan War; the community did not receive any compensation from the British despite Roberts' promise of allocating them a new building. Prior to the church's destruction the Rev. Imam Shah, the first 'native' Anglican priest of All Saints Church, Peshawar, visited the Kabul community where he administered Holy Communion and baptised a number of individuals, including adults.

An Armenian, who has been identified as Yahya, and who designated himself as 'translator of the Amir' on Gray's marriage certificate and who may have been a son or close relative of Lucas A. Joseph, acted as interpreter for Dr Gray during his time in Kabul. Gray published a photograph of himself and "the Armenian"  in his book, though he never names his interpreter.  Yahya accompanied Gray when he returned to England to get married, he also later accompanied Sardar Nasr Allah Khan on his state visit to England.

According to an unpublished letter in the hands of Dr Gray's descendants, Yahya was approached by British intelligence who wanted him to send confidential reports to India about the situation in Kabul, only for him to refuse as it was far too dangerous. However, on his return to Kabul the paranoid Amir 'Abd al-Rahman Khan suspected him of spying and in December 1897 he and all his extended family were expelled to Peshawar.

According to Seth In 1896, Amir Abdur Rahman Khan, sent a letter to the Armenian community at Calcutta, India (now Kolkata), asking that they send ten or twelve families to Kabul to "relieve the loneliness" of their fellow Christians whose numbers had continued to dwindle. However, despite an initial reply of interest, in the end, none of the Armenians of Calcutta accepted the offer. Unfortunately Seth does not quote his sources and this claim cannot be verified since such correspondence exists in the archives of the Armenian church of Nazareth in Calcutta.

Yahya, Lucas and all his family, including at least one babe-in-arms, arrived in Peshawar destitute and were eventually housed in the CMS Zenana Mission's hujra in Gor Khatri Bazaar.  Since the refugees had been stripped of all their property and were destitute both Yahya and Lucas Joseph wrote appeals to various British officials seeking financial assistance with but with no success. Lucas and his heirs eventually adopted the surname of Joseph and became citizens of India and later Pakistan. Two of Lucas' maiden aunts(?) worked for the Zanana Mission while his son, Paul N[asraddin] Joseph, eventually became the Medical Superintendent of the Peshawar Mission Hospital. after Partition. One of Dr Paul's sons, by his second. Punjabi wife, achieved high rank and military honours in the Pakistani army, another rose to the rank of Air Vice-Marshall, a third became a Professor in Edwardes College. A fourth son joined the Indian Air Force during the Second World War but was killed in a flying accident before he saw combat.

Some Armenians came with the Red Army during the Soviet invasion of Afghanistan; these veterans were reportedly interested in returning to Afghanistan again when Armenia announced in July 2009 that it would deploy medical specialists and interpreters in aid of the United Nations' International Security Assistance Force.

In 2010 an Armenian Orthodox chapel was established for the use of ISAF's Armenian contingent in Qunduz.

See also
Afghanistan–Armenia relations
Turks in Afghanistan
Russians in Afghanistan

References

Notes

Sources
Allen, Rev. I.N. (1843), Diary of a March through Sinde and Afghanistan, London
Barr, Lt. W. (1844), Journal of a march from Delhi to Peshawar, and from thence to Cabul, London
Burnes, Alexander (1834), Travels into Bukhara, London, vol. 1, London
Cox, R.H.J. (1948), Signposts on the Frontier, jottings from a Doctor's Notebook, London
Forster, George (1808), A Journey from Bengal to England through the northern part of India, Kashmir, Afghanistan and Persia, 2 vols, London
 
Gregorian, Vartan (1969), The Emergence of Modern Afghanistan, Stanford UP
Harlan, General Josiah (1939), Central Asia, Personal Narrative of General Josiah Harlan, ed. F.E. Ross, Luzac
Holland, H.B.T. (1953), No Second Spring, London

Karimi, 'Ali, مسیحیان کابل (Dari) http://8am.af/1393/08/04/kabul-christians-afghanistan-qani//
Lawrence, Maj. G. "Political Diaries of Maj. G. Lawrence, 30 July-4 Aug. 1848", Punjab Government Records, Lahore Political Diaries, 1846-1849, vol. IV
Lee, Jonathan L., (2002), "The Armenians of Kabul and Afghanistan", in Cairo to Kabul, Afghan and Islamic Studies presented to Ralph Pinder-Wilson, eds Warwick Ball and Len Harrow, London, pp. 157–62
Lee, Jonathan L. (1996), The Ancient Supremacy, Bukhara, Afghanistan and the Battle for Balkh, 1732-1901, E.J. Brill, Leiden
Lee, Jonathan L. (2002), "The Armenians of Kabul and Afghanistan," in Cairo to Kabul, Afghan and Islamic Studies presented to Ralph PInder-Wilson, Melisiande, London, pp. 157–162.
Masson, Charles (1842), Narrative of various Journeys in Baluchistan, Afghanistan, and the Panjab, 3 vols, London
Macintyre, Ben (2004), Josiah the Great, the true story of the man who would be King, London
Najmuddin, Shahzad Z., (2006) Armenia: A resumé, with notes on Seth's Armenians in India, Trafford Publishing, pp. 92–122
Sale, Lady Floentine (1843), A Journal of the Disasters in Afghanistan, London

Stirling, Edward (1991), The Journals of Edward Stirling in Persia and Afghanistan, 1828-1829, ed. J.L.Lee, IsMEO, Naples, 1991
Wollf, Rev. Joseph (1835), Researches and various Missionary Labours amongst the Jews, Mohammedans and other Sects, London

Afghanistan
Ethnic groups in Afghanistan
Immigration to Afghanistan
Afghanistan–Armenia relations